The 1915 Buffalo All-Stars (or just "All-Buffalo" as they were known in local papers) played in the Buffalo Semi Pro Football division which was considered part of the New York Pro Football League.  

The Buffalo All-Stars went through the season without suffering a defeat or having their goal line crossed while beating some of the best football squads in western and central New York, according to the manager's official report.

The team posted a record of 6–0-1 outscoring opponents 182-0 and considered themselves the champions of western New York football for 1915.

The team was called All-Buffalo, in part, because every section of the city of Buffalo, NY was represented on the squad.  The team consisted of the following players: Lynch, Provonsha, Bailey, Knapp. Tallchief, Gabriel, Gregory, Dooley, Sherman, Jeffrey, Henneman, Jones, Johnson and Shoemaker.  There were three former college players in the lineup, among them Johnson, an end from Penn State; Jeffrey, a half back from North Carolina; and Provonsha, a tackle from Oberlin.

Eugene F. Dooley played quarterback and also managed the team.

Schedule

References

Notes

External links
Pro Football Archives: 1915 Buffalo All-Stars season

Buffalo All-Americans seasons
Buffalo Prospects
1915 in sports in New York (state)